Michael Appleton is a British former professional tennis player.

Appleton, a Lancashire county player, was a top ranked British junior. His junior career included a win over Ivan Lendl at a tournament in Mexico. He made four doubles main draw appearances at the Wimbledon Championships during the 1970s and 1980s. His daughter Emily is a professional tennis player.

References

External links
 
 

Year of birth missing (living people)
Living people
British male tennis players
English male tennis players
Tennis people from Lancashire